Rajko Lotrič (born 20 August 1962) is a Yugoslavian former ski jumper. He competed at the 1988 Winter Olympics.

References

External links

Rajko Lotric at Olympic.org

1962 births
Living people
Slovenian male ski jumpers
Sportspeople from Jesenice, Jesenice
Olympic ski jumpers of Yugoslavia
Ski jumpers at the 1988 Winter Olympics